The following is the list of current and former television shows broadcast by the Indian television channel Colors TV.

Current broadcasts

Former broadcasts

Drama

Mythological series

Comedy

Horror, fantasy and supernatural

Reality and non-scripted

Animated

Pro wrestling/MMA

Aapka Colors
Aapka Colors is the United States of America and Canada version of Colors TV which includes English subtitles for every show. Some shows are available exclusively on this channel.

Ancient Healing by Dr. Pankaj Naram

See also
List of programs broadcast by Colors Rishtey

References

Colors TV original programming
Colors
Colors